Adenota is an alternative genus or sub-genus within the Reduncinae sub-family of family Bovidae, composed of the species Kobus kob (Kob) and Kobus vardonii (Puku).  It was described by Nowak in 1991.

Notes and references 

Marsh antelopes
Mammals of Africa